Joan Carson (born 29 January 1935) is a Unionist politician in Northern Ireland.

Born in Enniskillen, Carson studied at Enniskillen Collegiate School and Stranmillis College before working as a teacher.  In 1997 she was elected to Dungannon Borough Council for the Ulster Unionist Party (UUP), and at the 1998 Northern Ireland Assembly election, she was elected in Fermanagh and South Tyrone. In 1996 he was an unsuccessful candidate in the Northern Ireland Forum election in Fermanagh and South Tyrone.

Carson stood down from her council seat in 2001 and from her Assembly seat at the 2003 election.  She is currently a UUP party officer.

References

1935 births
Living people
Northern Ireland MLAs 1998–2003
Ulster Unionist Party MLAs
Female members of the Northern Ireland Assembly
People from Enniskillen
Politicians from County Fermanagh
Alumni of Queen's University Belfast
Alumni of Stranmillis University College
Schoolteachers from Northern Ireland
20th-century women politicians from Northern Ireland